Yuri Nikolaevich Gladkikh (born 8 October 1960) is a Soviet former footballer who played as a midfielder in the 1970s and 1980s.

Career
Born in Lipetsk, Gladkikh began playing football in the Soviet Second League with local side FC Metallurg Lipetsk. He appeared in 192 league matches over two stints with Metallurg. In 1983, Gladkikh joined Soviet First League side FC Iskra Smolensk, where he would make nearly 100 league appearances over four years. He also helped the club reach the semi-finals of the 1984–85 Soviet Cup, and was awarded Master of Sports of the USSR that year.

References

External links
Profile at Footballfacts.ru

1960 births
Living people
Russian footballers
Soviet footballers
Honoured Masters of Sport of the USSR
FC Metallurg Lipetsk players
FC Iskra Smolensk players
FC Irtysh Pavlodar players
FC Shakhter Karagandy players
FC Okzhetpes players
Association football forwards
Sportspeople from Lipetsk